Recovering the Satellites is the second studio album by American rock band Counting Crows, released on October 15, 1996, in the United States. Released three years after their debut album (and two years of worldwide touring), it reached No. 1 in the United States and was a top seller in Australia, Canada, and the UK as well. The album featured founding Counting Crows members Adam Duritz, David Bryson (guitar), Charlie Gillingham (keyboards), Matt Malley (bass), as well as new additions Ben Mize (drums) and Dan Vickrey (guitars). Multi-instrumentalist David Immerglück played on the album as a session musician as well. Counting Crows brought in producer Gil Norton for Recovering the Satellites. (The track "Miller's Angels" was produced by Marvin Etzioni.)  Three singles were released from the album, with "A Long December" being the best charting, reaching number 6 on the US Radio Songs chart and number 1 in Canada. The album itself peaked on the top spot of the Billboard Hot 200 album chart and has been certified double-platinum in both the US and Canada. Frontman Adam Duritz has called this his favorite album by the band.

Reception

Writing for Rolling Stone, Anthony DeCurtis gave the album four out of five stars. He said that the band's second album develops the sounds of August and Everything After and that they "largely achieve their serious ambitions". He praised Adam Duritz's lyrics and called the album "deeply satisfying".

In a review for Allmusic, Stephen Thomas Erlewine gave the album a rating of four stars out of five. He called it a "self-consciously challenging response" to their successful debut album. He described the songs as "slightly more somber" than those on the first album but "more affecting". He noted an occasional "pretentiousness" on the album but praised "A Long December" as particularly articulate.

Andy Gill from The Independent gave the album a more negative review. He criticized Duritz's song-writing as "self-pity[ing]" and called him a "classic solipsistic soul-barer, he just won't shut up about himself". He called the album "bland" with "obvious" influences (including R.E.M., Bruce Springsteen and Lynyrd Skynyrd). Gill had some praise for producer Gil Norton's work on the album.

In a review for Entertainment Weekly, Ken Tucker also had negative feelings about the album, and gave it a "C" grade. He criticized Duritz's "yowling" and "moans" and called Counting Crows a "pastiche of its influences".

Track listing
All tracks written by Adam Duritz unless otherwise indicated
"Catapult" (Duritz, David Bryson, Charlie Gillingham, Matt Malley, Dan Vickrey, Ben Mize) – 3:34
"Angels of the Silences" (Duritz, Gillingham) – 3:39
"Daylight Fading" (Duritz, Vickrey, Gillingham) – 3:50
"I'm Not Sleeping" (Duritz, Bryson, Gillingham, Malley, Vickrey, Mize) – 4:57
"Goodnight Elisabeth" – 5:20
"Children in Bloom" – 5:23
"Have You Seen Me Lately?" – 4:08
"Miller's Angels" (Duritz, Vickrey) – 6:33
"Another Horsedreamer's Blues" – 4:32
"Recovering the Satellites" – 5:24
"Monkey" – 3:02
"Mercury" – 2:48
"A Long December" – 4:57
"Walkaways" (Duritz, Vickrey) – 1:12

Personnel
Counting Crows
David Bryson – guitars, Dobro, tambourine, vocals
Adam Duritz – piano, tambourine, Wurlitzer, lead vocals
Charlie Gillingham – Hammond B-3, piano, Mellotron, Wurlitzer, accordion, harmonica, vocals
Matt Malley – electric bass guitar, double bass, vocals
Ben Mize – drums, tambourine, percussion, light bulbs, Zippo lighter, vocals
Dan Vickrey – guitars, vocals

Additional musicians
Paul Buckmaster – Orchestra conductor on "Daylight Fading", "I'm Not Sleeping", and "Another Horsedreamer's Blues"
Charlie Gillingham – string arrangements on "Daylight Fading", "I'm Not Sleeping", and "Another Horsedreamer's Blues"
Marvin Etzioni – mandolin on "Mercury"
David Immerglück – pedal steel guitar and octave mandolin on "Miller's Angels"

Charts

Weekly charts

Year-end charts

Certifications

References

External links

Retrospective by The A.V. Club

1996 albums
Albums produced by Gil Norton
Counting Crows albums
Geffen Records albums